This is a list of prominent Canadian judoka, including members of the Judo Canada Hall of Fame, lifetime members of Judo Canada, kōdansha (high dan-holders), all participants in the Olympics, Paralympics, and World Judo Championships, and coaches for those competitions.

Judo Canada Hall of Fame
The following judoka are members of Judo Canada's Hall of Fame, which was created in 1996 to honour Canada's "ambassadors of judo". There are two categories: 'athletes' and 'builders'.

Athletes

2018
Glenn Beauchamp
Amy Cotton
Frazer Will

2017
Lyne Poirier
Nathalie Gosselin

2014
Luce Baillargeon
Michelle Buckingham
Marie-Hélène Chisholm

2013
Keith Morgan
Ewan Beaton

2012
Pier Morten

2008
Nicolas Gill

2001
Louis Jani

2000
Rainer Fischer
Sandra Greaves

1999
Wayne Erdman

1998
Fred Blaney
Joe Meli
Lorraine Methot
Tina Takahashi

1997
Brad Farrow

1996
Mark Berger
Kevin Doherty
Doug Rogers
Phil Takahashi

Builders

2019
Guy Sunada

2015
Al Hadvick

2014
Allan Sattin
Joe Serianni

2012
Serge Piquette

2007
Jacques Lamade
Giselle Gravel
Céline Darveau

2005
Vincent Grifo

2004
Gérard Blanchet
Yuzuru Kojima
Perry Teale

2003
Yves LeGal
Carl Schell

2001
Yeiji Inouye

2000
Yoshitaka Mori
Frank Sakai
Daniel Tabouret

1999
William Doherty
Tomoaki Doi

1998
Tomatsu Mitani
Hiroshi Nakamura
Masao Takahashi
Satoru Tamoto

1997
Leo Haunsberger
Steve Kamino

1996
Raymond Damblant 
Frank Hatashita 
Yoshio Katsuta 
Mamoru Oye 
Shigetaka Sasaki 
Yoshio Senda 
Masatoshi Umetsu
Kenneth Whitney

Lifetime members of Judo Canada 
The following judoka were made lifetime members of Judo Canada in recognition of their major contributions to judo in Canada. Everyone in the Judo Canada Hall of Fame is also a lifetime member.

2019 

 Guy Sunada

2018 

 Glenn Beauchamp
 Amy Cotton
 Frazer Will

2017 

 Nathalie Gosselin
 Lyne Poirier

2015 

 Al Hadvick

2014 
Luce Baillargeon
Michelle Buckingham
Marie-Hélène Chisholm
Allan Sattin
Joe Serianni

2013
Keith Morgan
Ewan Beaton

2012
Pier Morten

2011 

 Serge Piquette

2008
Nicolas Gill

2007 

 Céline Darveau
 Gisèle Gravel
 Jacques Lamade

2005 

 Vincent Grifo

2004 

 Gérard Blanchet
 James O'Sullivan

2003 

 Yuzuru Kojima
 Yves LeGal
 Tom Mukai
 Momoru Oye
 Carl Schell

2001
Yeiji Inouye
Louis Jani
Hiroshi Nakamura

2000
Rainer Fischer
Sandra Greaves
Doug Rogers
Daniel Tabouret

1999
Wayne Erdman
John Wright

1998
Fred Blaney
Joe Meli
Lorraine Methot
Tina Takahashi

1997
William Doherty
Brad Farrow

1996
Mark Berger
Kevin Doherty
Tokio Kamino
Phil Takahashi
Goki Uemura
Kenneth Whitney

1994 

 Takeo Kawasaki
 Kunji Kuramoto
 Yonezuka Sakai

1988 

 Joseph Lestrage

1987 

 Leo Haunsberger
 Hisao Kuwada
 Yoshio Senda
 Masao Takahashi
 Harushi Tanigami

1985 

 Frank Hatashita

1984 

 Tomoaki Doi
 Yoshitaka Mori
 Shigetaka Sasaki
 Saturu Tamoto

1983 

 Yoshio Katsuta

1982 

 Tom Kamino
 Eiki Kawano
 Kameo Kawaguchi
 Hiroshi Mitani
 Frank Moritsugu
 Genichi Nakahara
 Shigeo Nakamura
 Mitsuyuki Sakata
 Masatoshi Umetsu
 Perry Teale

1980 

 Yutaka Okimura

Kōdansha 
The following is a list of Canada's kōdansha ('high dan holders').

Kudan (ninth dan)
 Raymond Damblant 
 Yeiji Inouye
 Hiroshi Nakamura
 Mamoru Oye
 Yoshio Senda

Hachidan (eighth dan)

 William Doherty
 Vincent Grifo
 Frank Hatashita
 Mitchell Kawasaki
 Yuzuru Kojima
 Yves LeGal
 Yoshitaka Mori
 Tom Mukai
 Genichiro Nakahara
 Yutaka Okimura
 Yonekazu Sakai
 Shigetaka Sasaki
 Masao Takahashi
 Satoru Tamoto
 Goki Uemura
 Duncan Vignale

Olympic Games
The following judoka have represented Canada at the Olympic Games. There are two categories: athletes and coaches.

Tokyo 2020

The 2020 Summer Olympics were postponed due to the COVID-19 pandemic and were held from 23 July to 8 August 2021.

Athletes
 Catherine Beauchemin-Pinard 
 Shady Elnahas
 Ecaterina Guica
 Jessica Klimkait 
 Arthur Margelidon
 Antoine Valois-Fortier

Coaches
 Sasha Mehmedovic
 Janusz Pawlowski

Rio de Janeiro 2016

Athletes 
 Antoine Bouchard
 Antoine Valois-Fortier
 Catherine Beauchemin-Pinard
 Ecaterina Guica
 Kelita Zupancic
 Kyle Reyes
 Sergio Pessoa

Coaches
 Nicolas Gill
 Michel Almeida
 Sasha Mehmedovic

London 2012

Athletes 
 Amy Cotton
 Alexandre Emond
 Sasha Mehmedovic
 Joliane Melançon
 Sergio Pessoa
 Nicholas Tritton
 Antoine Valois-Fortier 
 Kelita Zupancic

Coaches
 Nicolas Gill
 Sergio Pessoa

Beijing 2008

Athletes
Marylise Lévesque
Sasha Mehmedovic
Keith Morgan
Nicholas Tritton
Frazer Will

Coaches
 Nicolas Gill
 Sergio Pessoa

Athens 2004

Athletes
 Amy Cotton
 Marie-Hélène Chisholm
 Nicolas Gill
 Carolyne Lepage
 Keith Morgan
 Catherine Roberge

Coaches
 Hiroshi Nakamura
 Ewan Beaton

Sydney 2000

Athletes
Luce Baillargeon
Michelle Buckingham
Nicolas Gill 
Keith Morgan
Kimberly Ribble
Sophie Roberge

Coaches
 Hiroshi Nakamura

Atlanta 1996

Athletes
Ewan Beaton
Michelle Buckingham
Nancy Filteau
Nicolas Gill
Nathalie Gosselin
Niki Jenkins
Carolyne Lepage
Colin Morgan
Keith Morgan
Marie-Josée Morneau
Taro Tan

Coaches
 Hiroshi Nakamura
 Andrzej Sądej

Barcelona 1992

Athletes
 Ewan Beaton
 Michelle Buckingham
 Jean-Pierre Cantin
 Nicolas Gill 
 Sandra Greaves
 Roman Hatashita
 Brigitte Lastrade
 Pascale Mainville
 Jane Patterson
 Lyne Poirier
 Patrick Roberge
 Alison Webb

Coaches
 Lionel Langlais
 Andrzej Sądej

Seoul 1988

Athletes
 Glenn Beauchamp
 Kevin Doherty
 Louis Jani
 Joseph Meli
 Phil Takahashi
 Craig Weldon

Coaches
 Hiroshi Nakamura
 Tina Takahashi

Los Angeles 1984

Athletes
Glenn Beauchamp
Mark Berger 
Fred Blaney
Kevin Doherty
Brad Farrow
Louis Jani
Joseph Meli
Phil Takahashi

Coaches
 Jim Kojima

Moscow 1980

A team was selected, but Canada boycotted the 1980 Olympic Games in protest of the Soviet Union's invasion of Afghanistan.

Athletes
 Alain Cyr
 Brad Farrow
 Tom Greenway
 Gary Hirose
 Tim Hirose
 Louis Jani
 Phil Takahashi

Coaches
 Yoshio Senda

Montreal 1976

Athletes
 Wayne Erdman
 Brad Farrow
 Rainer Fischer
 Tom Greenway
 Joseph Meli

Coaches
 Hiroshi Nakamura

Munich 1972

Athletes
 Terry Farnsworth
 Philip Illingworth
 William McGregor
 Doug Rogers
 Alan Sakai

Coaches
 Leo Haunsberger

Tokyo 1964

Athletes
Doug Rogers

Paralympic Games
The following judoka have represented Canada at the Paralympic Games. There are two categories: athletes and coaches.

Tokyo 2020

The 2020 Summer Paralympics were postponed due to the COVID-19 pandemic and were held from 24 August to 5 September 2021.

Athletes
 Priscilla Gagné

Coaches
 Andrzej Sądej

Rio de Janeiro 2016

Athletes
Priscilla Gagné
Tony Walby

London 2012

Athletes
Justin Karn
Tim Rees
Tony Walby

Coaches
Tom Thompson

Beijing 2008

Athletes
William Morgan

Coaches
Tom Thompson

Athens 2004

Athletes
William Morgan

Coaches
Tom Thompson

Sydney 2000

Athletes
William Morgan
Pier Morten

Coaches
Tom Thompson

Atlanta 1996

Athletes
Pier Morten

Barcelona 1992

Athletes
Pier Morten

Seoul 1988

Athletes
Eddie Morten 
Pier Morten

World Judo Championships
The following judoka have represented Canada at the World Judo Championships. There are two categories: athletes and coaches.

Budapest 2021

Athletes 
 Étienne Briand
 Shady Elnahas
 Mohab Elnahas
 Christa Deguchi
 Marc Deschenes
 Jessica Klimkait 
 Ecaterina Guica
 Kyle Reyes

Tokyo 2019

Athletes 
 Catherine Beauchemin-Pinard
 Étienne Briand
 Zachary Burt
 Shady Elnahas
 Christa Deguchi 
 Constantin Gabun
 Ecaterina Gucia
 Jessica Klimkait
 Arthur Margelidon
 Kyle Reyes
 Jacob Valois
 Antoine Valois-Fortier

Baku 2018

Athletes
 Catherine Beauchemin-Pinard
 Antoine Bouchard
 Étienne Briand
 Emily Burt
 Zachary Burt
 Christa Deguchi 
 Ecaterina Gucia
 Jessica Klimkait
 Louis Krieber-Gagon
 Arthur Margelidon
 Kyle Reyes
 Stéphanie Tremblay
 Kelita Zupancic

Budapest 2017

Athletes
 Catherine Beauchemin-Pinard
 Antoine Bouchard
 Étienne Briand
 Zachary Burt
 Ecaterina Gucia
 Ana Laura Portundo Isasi
 Jessica Klimkait
 Louis Krieber-Gagon
 Bradley Langois
 Arthur Margelidon
 Kyle Reyes
 Stéphanie Tremblay
 Antoine Valois-Fortier
 Kelita Zupancic

Astana 2015

Athletes
 Catherine Beauchemin-Pinard
 Antoine Bouchard
 Étienne Briand
 Patrick Gagné
 Ecaterina Gucia
 Arthur Margelidon
 Sérgio Pessoa Jr
 Alix Renaud-Roy
 Kyle Reyes
 Stéphanie Tremblay
 Antoine Valois-Fortier 
 Kelita Zupancic

Chelyabinsk 2014

Athletes
 Catherine Beauchemin-Pinard
 Antoine Bouchard
 Étienne Briand
 Monica Burgess
 Patrick Gagné
 Alexis Morin-Martel
 Kyle Reyes
 Catherine Roberge
 Stéphanie Tremblay
 Antoine Valois-Fortier 
 Kelita Zupancic

Rio de Janeiro 2013

Athletes
 Catherine Beauchemin-Pinard
 Étienne Briand
 Amy Cotton
 Alexandre Emond
 Patrick Gagné
 Sasha Mehmedovic
 Joliane Melançon
 Alexis Morin-Martel
 Sérgio Pessoa Jr
 Catherine Roberge
 Stéphanie Tremblay
 Antoine Valois-Fortier 
 Kelita Zupancic

Paris 2011

Athletes
 Amy Cotton
 Alexandre Emond
 Sasha Mehmedovic
 Joliane Melançon
 Guillaume Perrault
 Michal Popiel
 Catherine Roberge
 Nicholas Tritton
 Antoine Valois-Fortier 
 Frazer Will
 Kelita Zupancic

Tokyo 2010

Athletes
 Amy Cotton
 Alexandre Emond
 Kalem Kachur
 Isabel Latulippe
 Sasha Mehmedovic
 Joliane Melançon
 Guillaume Perrault
 Sérgio Pessoa Jr
 Michal Popiel
 Catherine Roberge
 Nicholas Tritton
 Frazer Will
 Kelita Zupancic

Rotterdam 2009

Athletes
 Amy Cotton
 Scott Edward
 Alexandre Emond
 Kalem Kachur
 Joliane Melançon
 Sérgio Pessoa Jr
 Michal Popiel
 Nicholas Tritton

Rio de Janeiro 2007

Athletes
 Olia Berger
 Marie-Hélène Chisholm
 Isabel Latulippe
 Marylise Levesque
 Sasha Mehmedovic
 Keith Morgan
 Catherine Roberge
 Aminata Sall
 Nicholas Tritton
 Frazer Will

Cairo 2005

Athletes
 Olia Berger
 Michelle Buckingham
 Marie-Hélène Chisholm
 Alexandru Ciupe
 Amy Cotton
 Isabel Latulippe
 Sasha Mehmedovic
 Catherine Roberge
 Aminata Sall
 Nicholas Tritton
 Frazer Will

Osaka 2003

Athletes
 Michelle Buckingham
 Marie-Hélène Chisholm
 Amy Cotton
 Nicolas Gill
 Carolyne Lepage
 Jean-François Marceau
 Keith Morgan
 Aminata Sall
 Daniel-Guillaume Simard

Munich 2001

Athletes
 Michelle Buckingham
 Marie-Hélène Chisholm
 Alexandru Ciupe
 Stéphane Chrétien
 Nicolas Gill
 Jacynthe Maloney
 Jean-François Marceau
 Keith Morgan
 Sophie Roberge
 Aminata Sall

Birmingham 1999

Athletes
 Luce Baillargeon
 Nicolas Gill 
 Niki Jenkins
 Brigette Lastrade
 Carolyne Lepage
 Keith Morgan
 Sophie Roberge

Paris 1997

Athletes
 Luce Baillargeon
 Michelle Buckingham
 Brigette Lastrade
 Carolyne Lepage
 Keith Morgan

Chiba 1995

Athletes
 Ewan Beaton
 Michelle Buckingham
 Nicolas Gill 
 Nathalie Gosselin
 Renee Hock
 Niki Jenkins
 Nancy Filteau
 James Kendrick
 Carolyne Lepage
 David Miller
 Keith Morgan
 Maxime Roberge
 Sophie Roberge
 Taro Tan

Hamilton 1993

Athletes
 Ewan Beaton
 Michelle Buckingham
 Jean-Pierre Cantin
 Nicolas Gill 
 Renee Hock
 Louis Jani
 Niki Jenkins
 Jan Karnik
 Brigette Lastrade
 Colin Morgan
 Jane Patterson
 Dominique Pilon
 Sophie Roberge
 Taro Tan

Barcelona 1991

Athletes
 Ewan Beaton
 Jean-Pierre Cantin
 Andrée Dupont
 Nicolas Gill 
 Roman Hatashita
 Louis Jani
 Kimberly Bergey Kaip
 Brigette Lastrade
 Pascale Mainville
 Jane Patterson
 Lyne Porier
 Allison Webb

Belgrade 1989

Athletes
 Ronald Angus
 Jean-Pierre Cantin
 Mandy Clayton
 Roger Côté
 Nathalie Gosselin
 Sandra Greaves
 Roman Hatashita
 James Kendrick
 Charlotte Streicek
 Aartje Vroegh
 Allison Webb
 Kevin West

Essen 1987

Athletes
 Fred Blaney
 Jean-Pierre Cantin
 Mandy Clayton
 Kevin Doherty
 Sandra Greaves
 Kathy Hubble
 Hartley Jones
 Joe Meli
 Jane Patterson
 Lyne Porier
 Karen Sheffield
 Steven Sheffield
 Allison Webb

Maastricht 1986

Athletes
 Mandy Clayton
 Sandra Greaves
 Kathy Hubble
 Lyne Porier
 Karen Sheffield
 Allison Webb

Seoul 1985

Athletes
 Glenn Beauchamp
 Mark Berger
 Fred Blaney
 Kevin Doherty
 Brad Farrow
 Louis Jani
 Joe Meli
 Phil Takahashi

Vienna 1984

Athletes
 Nancy Filteau
 Lorraine Méthot
 Karen Sheffield
 Tina Takahashi
 Susan Ulrich
 Aartje Vroegh

Moscow 1983

Athletes
 Mark Berger
 Fred Blaney
 Alain Cyr
 Kevin Doherty
 Brad Farrow
 Tim Hirose
 Louis Jani
 Phil Takahashi

Paris 1982

Athletes
 Diane Amyot
 Mandy Clayton
 Nancy Filteau
 Lorraine Méthot
 Karen Sheffield
 Tina Takahashi

Maastricht 1981

Athletes
 Mark Berger
 Brad Farrow
 Alain Cyr
 Kevin Doherty 
 Gary Hirose
 Joe Meli
 Phil Takahashi

New York 1980

Athletes
 Andrée Barrette
 Sara Hockett
 Lorraine Méthot
 Karen Millar
 Karen Sheffield
 Tina Takahashi
 Susan Ulrich

Paris 1979

Athletes
 Alain Cyr
 Brad Farrow
 Tom Greenway
 Gary Hirose
 Tim Hirose
 Louis Jani
 Phil Takahashi

Vienna 1975

Athletes
 Wayne Erdman
 Brad Farrow
 Rainer Fisher
 Daniel Hardy
 Gary Hirose
 Chris Preobrazenski

Lausanne 1973

Athletes
 Wayne Erdman
 Terry Farnworth
 Mitchell Kawasaki
 Paul Kereliuk
 Roger Perron
 Alan Sakai
 Goki Uemura
 Udo Werner

Ludwigshafen 1971

Athletes
 Nick Bleyendaal
 Gordon Buttle
 Wayne Erdman
 Terry Farnworth
 Mitchell Kawasaki
 Charles Maingon
 Henry Mukai
 John O'Neil
 Ron Powell

Mexico City 1969

Athletes
 Nick Bleyendaal
 Gilles Champagne
 Albert Dore
 Vincent Grifo
 Marcel Gueymard
 Gary Hirose
 Algis Liauba
 Charles Maingon
 Henry Mukai
 Rick Yodogawa

Salt Lake City 1967

Athletes
 Pat Bolger
 Gordon Buttle
 Mike Johnson
 Doug Rogers
 Tom Tamura

Rio de Janeiro 1965

Athletes
 Doug Rogers

Paris 1961

Athletes
 Manfred Matt

Tokyo 1958

Athletes
 Masatoshi Umetsu

Tokyo 1956

Athletes
 Bernard Gauthier

See also
Judo in Canada

References

Further reading
. Includes a list of all Canadian kodansha ('high dan holders') from sixth to ninth dan as of 2019.

 Includes a Canadian black belt registry from 1946 to 1997 with approximately 5000 names.

judoka
Judo in Canada